Ratchathewi is a district (khet) in central Bangkok, Thailand. Clockwise from the north, its neighboring districts are Phaya Thai, Din Daeng, Huai Khwang, Watthana, Pathum Wan and Dusit.

History

The district was part of Dusit district prior to 1966, and part of Phaya Thai District from 1966 to 1989, when it was elevated to its own district. The name is inherited from Ratchathewi Intersection, which is the intersection of Phetchaburi Road and Phaya Thai Road. The name originally comes from a royal consort to King Chulalongkorn, Phra Nangchao Sukumalmarsri Phra Ratchathewi. The term Phra Rachathewi (also spelled Phra Rajadevi) is a royal rank for royal consorts.

Administration

The district is sub-divided into four sub-district (Khwaeng).

Landmarks

Victory Monument was built by Prime Minister Plaek Phibunsongkhram to honour the 59 soldiers who died in the French-Thai War. The opening ceremony was held on 24 June 1942. It was built to the shape of five bayonets joined together and five statues around its base representing army, navy, air force, police, and civilian bureaucracy. There are 809 names inscribed below the statues, including the losses from World War II and the Korean War. The BTS skytrain station is nearby, and it used to be a major bus hub (until the 2016 when the bus hub was relocated to Mo Chit 2 Bus Station, platform area 3).

Baiyoke Tower (151 meters high, 43 floors) and Baiyoke Tower II (304 m, 85 fl) are both former tallest buildings in Bangkok that cannot be missed from the skyline. They are located in proximity in the area known as Pratu Nam. (Also see Shopping section below.) The construction of Baiyoke Tower was finished in 1987 and remained the tallest until 1993. Baiyoke Tower II was finished in late 1997 and opened to public January 1998. Both buildings are mostly utilized as hotels Baiyoke Suite (in tower I) and Baiyoke Sky (tower II) with lower floors as commercial shops.

Suan Pakkad Palace is a museum exhibiting Thai antiques, from ancient to recent ones. The museum compound contains eight traditional wooden Thai houses with exhibits inside. The old Ban Chiang pottery dates back to 4,000 years ago is among the highlight exhibits and is located in a modern Chumbhot-Pantip gallery building.

Diplomatic missions
 Embassy of East Timor
 Embassy of Indonesia

Transportation
 BTS skytrain - Three stations: Ratchathewi, Phaya Thai and Victory Monument.
 MRT - One station: Phetchaburi.
 Express boats - Khlong Saen Saeb, in the southern district border.

The area around the current Makkasan Railway Station is under construction for the Airport Link to Suvarnabhumi Airport. The area will become City Air Terminal with check in facility and non-stop train to the airport. The terminal also has an interchange to MRT Phetchaburi station.

Bueng Makkasan
Located in Ratchathewi district is a large artificial lake in the center of Bangkok. Bueng Makkasan (บึงมักกะสัน) is 2.4 km long, 60 m wide and 15 m deep. It is utilized for inner Bangkok flood prevention. Now the lake is covered by the system of expressway interconnections.

Health 

 Public Hospitals
Ramathibodi Hospital
 Phramongkutklao Hospital
 Rajavithi Hospital
 Queen Sirikit National Institute of Child Health
Hospital for Tropical Diseases
 Burachat Chaiyakorn Hospital
 Private Hospitals
 Bhumirajanagarindra Kidney Institute
 Phyathai 1 Hospital

Education

Universities
Mahidol University: Phaya Thai Campus, consists of
Faculty of Medicine Ramathibodi Hospital
Faculty of Dentistry
Faculty of Science
Faculty of Pharmacy
Faculty of Public Health
Faculty of Tropical Medicine
College of Medicine, Rangsit University
Phramongkutklao College of Medicine
Royal Thai Army Nursing College
Valaya Alongkorn Rajabhat University: Bangkok Campus, Rajabhat University located at 153 Phetchaburi Road, Thung Phaya Thai Sub-District, Ratchathewi District near Siam Commercial Bank, Phetchaburi Road Branch, its name after Valaya Alongkorn, Princess of Phetchaburi.
Schools
The Indonesian School of Bangkok, is located at the Indonesian Embassy compound in the district.
Sri Ayudhya School, a high school located on Si Ayutthaya Road, Thanon Phaya Thai Sub-District, Ratchathewi District.
Santirat Witthayalai School, a high school located on Si Ayutthaya Road, Thung Phaya Thai Sub-District, Ratchathewi District.
Amnuay Silpa School, a coeducational private school located on Si Ayutthaya Road, Thung Phaya Thai Sub-District, Ratchathewi District.
Phaya Thai School, primary school located on Si Ayutthaya Road, Thung Phaya Thai Sub-District, Ratchathewi District.
Saint Dominic School, boys' school located on New Phetchaburi Road, Makkasan Sub-District, Ratchathewi District
Other
Wannasorn Tower, the education hub located by the Phaya Thai junction, was founded by Uraiwan Sivakul, a Chemistry tutor. The tower is now the main hub of Thai tutoring schools.

Gallery

References

 Makkasan Waste Water Treatment Through Filtration by Water Hyacinth (Bangkok)

External links

 BMA website with the tourist landmarks of Ratchathewi
 Ratchathewi district office (Thai only)
 Bangkok's Crucible of Construction (Items 1 to 7 and 35 to 42. The rest belong to nearby Pathum Wan district)
 Suan Pakkad Palace Museum

 
Districts of Bangkok